Rainer Karlsch (born 3 April 1957) is a German historian and author.

Karlsch was born in Stendal. He studied economic history at the Humboldt University of Berlin. He graduated in 1986 as a Doctor of Economics.

From 1992-1994, assistant to the Historical commission on
Berlin (Historischen Kommission zu Berlin).

From 1995-1998, assistant to a key DFG program.

Since 1999, assistant to Institute for economic policy and economic history of the Free University of Berlin.

Together with the TV journalist Heiko Petermann, he investigated intensively the four-year history of German atomic research. They were supported by international historians, physicists and radio chemists. In 2005, he published his controversial book Hitlers Bombe, in which he argued Nazi Germany may have secretly developed and tested a nuclear weapon. Other historians  have disputed his claims. 

He is a winner of the Stinnes Award.

Bibliography

Sowjetische Demontagen in Deutschland 1944-1949. Hintergründe, Ziele und Wirkungen. (Zeitgeschichtliche Forschungen; ZFF 17) - 
Allein bezahlt? Die Reparationsleistungen der SBZ/DDR 1945-53, Ch. Links Verlag 1993 - , reprint: Elbe-Dnepr Verlag 2004 
Faktor Öl: Die Mineralölwirtschaft in Deutschland 1859-1974 - 
Urangeheimnisse (Uranium secrets) - 
Hitlers Bombe (Hitler's Bomb) -  , released on March 14, 2005

References

External links 
 Personal website 

1957 births
Living people
Humboldt University of Berlin alumni
German male non-fiction writers
20th-century German historians
21st-century German historians